James Edward Cooray Smith (born in Solihull in 1978) is a British writer, critic and columnist of patrilineal Indian descent. He has written for journals including New Statesman and Prospect. He has also contributed to the Doctor Who audio and DVD range.

Career

A graduate of University College London, Cooray Smith has written radio drama and comedy. He has contributed to numerous news, film and science fiction magazines. He has a specific interest in British television history.

Asked about his long-term habit of co-writing with a variety of people, Cooray Smith commented: "I've written things with a lot of different people, partially because I'm a great believer in third brain theory, and partially as a series of attempts to disguise my own lack of talent!"

In 2017, he responded to the casting of Jodie Whittaker in Doctor Who by writing an article describing those who disagreed with the lead character's sex change of being misogynistic. His article was entitled "Uncomfortable with a female Doctor Who? It’s time to admit your real motives".

Bibliography

New Statesman Columns

http://www.newstatesman.com/writers/321282

Hero Collector Writer's Page

http://herocollector.com/en-gb/About/james-cooray-smith

Non-Fiction Books
 The Life and Trials of Ally McBeal (2000) (with Mark Clapham)
 Manhattan Dating Game: Sex and the City (2002)
 Tim Burton (2002) (with J Clive Matthews)
 Bond Films (2003) (with Stephen Lavington)
 George Lucas (2003)
 Gangster Films (2004)
 The Lord of the Rings: The Books, the Films, the Radio Series (2005) (with J Clive Matthews)
 Quentin Tarantino (2005)
 Who's Next? A Guide To Broadcast Doctor Who (2005) (with Mark Clapham and Eddie Robson)
 The Black Archive #2: The Massacre  (2015)
 The Black Archive #14:The Ultimate Foe  (2017)
 The Silver Archive #3:Sapphire and Steel Assignments 5 & 6  (2018)

Short fiction
  "A Gallery of Pigeons"' (2009) in Secret Histories "'Excalibur of Mars" (2009) in Present Danger "The Found World" (2010), in Miss Wildthyme and Friends InvestigateRadio and Audio work

 That Mitchell and Webb Sound
Series Four (2009) (sketch writer)

 Bernice Summerfield
 The Adventure of the Diogenes Damsel (2008)

 Kaldor City
 Occam's Razor (2000) (with Alan Stevens)
 Hidden Persuaders (2003) (with Fiona Moore)

Doctor Who DVD Production History Notes

 The Twin Dilemma (2009)
 The Space Museum (2010)
 Underworld (Doctor Who) (2010)
 Kinda (2011)
 Snakedance (2011)
 The Ark (Doctor Who) (2011)
 The Sun Makers'' (2011)

References

External links
 Steven Poole's 'Non Fiction Choice' Review of 'Tim Burton' from 'The Guardian'
 Shiny Shelf website (No Longer Updated)
 Kaldor City website

1978 births
Alumni of University College London
British biographers
British dramatists and playwrights
British film critics
British male dramatists and playwrights
British male novelists
British science fiction writers
Living people
People from Solihull
Male biographers